Lana M. Tisdel (born May 28, 1975) is an American woman whose early life and involvement with the December 1993 murders of Brandon Teena, Lisa Lambert and Phillip DeVine, at the hands of John Lotter and Tom Nissen, is chronicled in the 1998 documentary The Brandon Teena Story and the 1999 film Boys Don't Cry (which left out DeVine). She was portrayed in the film by Chloë Sevigny, who was nominated for an Academy Award for her performance.

Background 
In the fall of 1993, Tisdel, aged 18, met Brandon Teena, 20, through their mutual friends. Teena was new to the close-knit area, from Lincoln, Nebraska, and the local crowd was curious about him. Teena and Tisdel began seeing each other, because Tisdel found Teena attractive and believed Brandon was a cisgender man. He was in fact a transgender man: assigned female at birth. Tisdel has made it clear that her relationship with Brandon Teena was brief and did not include sex; only lasting about two months from their first meeting until the murder. However, their two-month relationship is described as very intense. Her mother Linda testified that Tisdel would be with Brandon all day, had trouble sleeping, and their relationship was all she cared about during that time.

On December 19, 1993, Brandon Teena was arrested for forging checks, and put in jail for several days. Tisdel found out he was transgender after his birth name was printed in the local newspaper in the arrests section. Tisdel paid to get him out of jail, and he told her that he was undergoing sex reassignment surgery. Tisdel has disputed claims that after the truth was revealed to her, they continued a romantic relationship, but instead she told Brandon that they could still be friends. Tisdel defended Teena often, at one point lying to authorities and telling them she had seen him naked and saw his penis, in hopes they would leave him alone.

Two people that they were friends with during this time were John Lotter and Tom Nissen. Both young men had criminal records, and Teena had been staying with Nissen. Falls City is a small town, and all of these families were well-acquainted; Lana's best friend was Michelle Lotter, John's sister. Initially friendly, Lotter and Nissen soon began to harass Teena and Tisdel and scrutinize their relationship. During a Christmas Eve party, Lotter and Nissen forced Teena to take off his clothes in order to show everyone, including Lana, his genitals.

The two then kidnapped Teena and took him to a rural area, where they raped and beat him. Afterwards, Teena came to Tisdel's house, and Tisdel and her mother convinced him to speak to the police and go to the hospital. Lotter and Nissen had told Teena that if he told anyone what they did, they would kill him.

Murders 
A few days later, on New Year's Eve 1993, Lotter and Nissen came to the Tisdel residence drunk and looking for Brandon, and threatened the Tisdel sisters. They then drove to the house of Lisa Lambert, where Brandon had been hiding out. Also in the house was Phillip DeVine, a friend of theirs who was dating Tisdel's sister Leslie. Lisa Lambert was a single mother from Pawnee City, Nebraska, who often let friends stay with her in exchange for their help and company, because she lived outside of town. Lotter and Nissen then shot Brandon, Lambert, and DeVine dead. Lambert's son Tanner was in the house at the time and was unharmed. Tisdel was not present at the time of the murder, as it took place inside Lambert's home in Humboldt, Nebraska, a 30-minute drive away from Falls City, where Tisdel lived with her mother and sister. The bodies were discovered the next day by Lambert's mother, Anna Mae.

Aftermath 
Lana Tisdel, her sister Leslie, and mother Linda were all involved in the criminal trial and later lawsuits that followed the murder and later, movie development. The Tisdel family appeared on the TV shows Maury and A Current Affair, to discuss Brandon Teena and the trial proceedings. The Tisdel family did not get along well with Teena's mother, Jo Ann Brandon, and his sister, Tammy, who accused Tisdel of being responsible for the murders.

Tisdel sued the creators of the film Boys Don't Cry for using her name and likeness without permission; the suit was settled out of court. Leslie Tisdel was vocal about the film's script changes, and upset that her boyfriend who was murdered, Phillip DeVine, was not included in the film, nor was she, and instead the film focused on Brandon Teena. There has been scrutiny that the lack of information about DeVine, who was from Iowa, is because he was African American, and Leslie stated she believed he has been left out of the story because of racism. When Boys Don't Cry was released, she petitioned Nebraska movie theatre owners to not show the film. Lisa Lambert's name was changed to Candace in the movie. Tisdel's mother, Linda Gutierres, who died on December 2, 2003, at age 54, was portrayed in the film by Jeannetta Arnette.

Tanner Lambert graduated from Humboldt High School in 2011, and was raised by his aunt. John Lotter and Tom Nissen are currently in prison, with Nissen serving life imprisonment and Lotter facing execution.

Tisdel graduated from Falls City High School in 1993. She married Josh Bachman in 2001 and lives in Kansas with their children.

In August 2020, Tisdel was injured in a car accident when she struck Glenn D. Aston, 66, head-on. Aston was killed in the crash. Tisdel was taken to Stormont Vail Hospital in Topeka, Kansas with serious injuries.

References

External links 
 

1974 births
Living people
1998 in LGBT history
People from Falls City, Nebraska